The 1995 Volta a la Comunitat Valenciana was the 53rd edition of the Volta a la Comunitat Valenciana road cycling stage race, which was held from 22 to 26 February 1995. The race started in Calpe and finished in Castellón. The race was won by Alex Zülle of the  team.

General classification

References

Volta a la Comunitat Valenciana
Volta a la Comunitat Valenciana
Volta a la Comunitat Valenciana